Legiun Mangkunegaran was an Army corps in Java, Indonesia. It originated in 1757 as the court army of Prince Sambernyawa of Mangkunegaran. After colonisation of Java by the Netherlands it was reorganised by Herman Willem Daendels and Mangkunegara II as part of the Dutch forces, but with Javanese commanders.

See also 
 Legiun Pakualaman

References

Mangkunegaran
Military units and formations established in 1757
Military units and formations of Indonesia